The Hawaii Rainbow Warriors football team, representing the University of Hawaiʻi at Mānoa, has had 69 American football players drafted into the National Football League (NFL) since the first draft in 1936. The highest that a Warrior has ever been drafted is 19th overall, which occurred when Ashley Lelie was drafted in 2002. The St. Louis Rams have drafted the most Warriors with six.

Each NFL franchise seeks to add new players through the annual NFL Draft. The draft rules were last updated in 2009. The team with the worst record the previous year picks first, the next-worst team second, and so on. Teams that did not make the playoffs are ordered by their regular-season record, with any remaining ties broken by strength of schedule. Playoff participants are sequenced after non-playoff teams, based on their round of elimination (wild card, division, conference, and Super Bowl).

Before the merger agreement in 1966, the American Football League (AFL) operated in direct competition with the NFL and held a separate draft. This led to a massive bidding war over top prospects between the two leagues, along with the subsequent drafting of the same player in each draft. As part of the merger agreement on June 8, 1966, the two leagues held a multiple round "Common Draft". Once the AFL officially merged with the NFL in 1970, the "Common Draft" simply became the NFL Draft.

The most Warriors selected in a single NFL Draft is five, in 2007. Of the Warriors selected in the NFL Draft, two have been selected to a Pro Bowl: Jason Elam and Jesse Sapolu. Nine have been a member of a Super Bowl winning team, including Sapolu and Elam. One Warrior, Jim Mills, is a member of the Canadian Football Hall of Fame.

Key

Players selected

Notes

References
General

 

Specific

Lists of National Football League draftees by college football team

Hawaii sports-related lists